A Million Days may refer to:

a song by Big Wreck from Albatross
a song by Prince from Musicology